Romina Contiero (born 1983) known as Tata Golosa  is an Italian female singer and a professional dancer. Her producers are Antonello Righi and Daniele Filippone.

She became famous in 2007 with the videoclip Micromania, which became very popular in Brazil and Portugal and became a summer hit,  a  candidate to be the "song of the summer" in Spain.

Romina Contiero has a degree in dance, teaches jazz dance and is a co-owner of three dance schools in Milan.

She has been engaged to Marco Masini from 2001 to 2005.

Discography
2014: Busca Busca (single)
2009: Fotonovela (album)
2008: La Pastilla (single)
2008: Micromania (single) 
2007: Micromania (Los micrófonos) (videoclip)

References

http://www.tatagolosa.it/

1983 births
Living people
21st-century Italian singers
21st-century Italian women singers